Luigi Bernasconi (3 May 1909 – 2 April 1970) was an Italian ski jumper. He competed in the individual event at the 1928 Winter Olympics.

References

External links
 

1909 births
1970 deaths
Italian male ski jumpers
Olympic ski jumpers of Italy
Ski jumpers at the 1928 Winter Olympics
People from Graubünden